Toni Rüttimann (Pontresina, 21 August 1967) is a Swiss bridge builder who works in Southeast Asia and in Latin America, where he is known as Toni el Suizo (Toni the Swiss).

Toni Rüttimann works independently alongside communities in need, using recycled materials and charging no fees.

Companies contribute by donating their used material and local governments concede permits and help with transportation in recognition of the fact that the main effort is made by the population. No one asks for anything in return and the bridge belongs to the population who built it.

The bridges are for use of pedestrians, pack animals, motorcycles, two-wheel-tractors – but not for cars.

In every country where Toni works, he builds up a small team of national welders and looks for one “bridge-building partner”, to whom he teaches his craft, and who in turn is able to perform maintenance duties on the bridges built.

Toni has no home residence: he carries everything he needs in two bags. One for his personal belongings, the other for his laptop computer and a few tools for his trade.

In collaboration with local communities, he has built 760 bridges which serve two million people (as of August 22, 2017).

Biography

Beginnings in Ecuador
In 1987, two weeks before finishing high school at the Lyceum Alpinum Zuoz, Toni sees images on TV of the destruction caused by an earthquake in Ecuador. He decides to depart to South America on the night of his graduation, taking his personal savings and 9000 Swiss Francs donated by neighbours of Pontresina and the Engadine Valley.

Once in the disaster area, in northeastern Ecuador, Toni meets a Dutch hydraulics engineer. With his technical help and assistance from the people of the Flor del Valle village, cut off from the outside by a tributary of the Aguarico river, he builds a 52-meter long suspension bridge.

After six months in Ecuador, Toni returns to Switzerland and begins his studies of civil engineering at the Federal Institute of Technology in Zurich. However, seven weeks later he decides to leave university and return to Ecuador to help immediately.

In the Amazon region of Ecuador he puts together a system for building bridges with the communities, requiring almost no money: the villagers bring stone and sand, the hard wood and their labour. Toni asks for donations of used wire rope from the oil drilling rigs in the region and for scrap pipe from the national oil company Petroecuador.

From 1988 to 1990 he builds six bridges. One of them, across the Aguarico river with a span of 264 meters, remains the longest of his bridges. Toni el Suizo, as the Ecuadorian peasants named him, invented the “puentes de chatarra” (bridges made of scrap).

In the oil town Lago Agrio of Ecuador, Toni finds a partner in Walter Yánez, a welder and mechanic. Over the next seven years the two friends build another 82 bridges throughout Ecuador – always with the help of the local population – as well as 10 bridges in Colombia, in the wake of the 1994 Páez River earthquake at the Nevado del Huila volcano.

From Ecuador to Central America

By November 1998 Toni and Walter had built 99 bridges. That same month, with air-transport by the Ecuadorian Air Force, the two friends rush to help in Honduras, devastated by Hurricane Mitch, where they build another 33 bridges. Other bridges follow in Costa Rica and Nicaragua, and also an international bridge between Honduras and El Salvador.

In 2000 Toni receives pipes for 29 bridges in the state of Veracruz, Mexico from the steel pipe manufacturer Tamsa (Tubos de Acero de México SA, today TenarisTamsa).

Passage to Cambodia
During his visits to Switzerland Toni gives presentations in schools and universities. On one such occasion, in 2000, he meets a Cambodian refugee who asks him for help in the name of his people.

In April 2001 he starts working with two teams, with Walter Yánez in Mexico and with his two new Cambodian partners, Yin Sopul, mechanic, and Pen Sopoan, truck driver, both survivors of the genocide perpetrated by the Khmer Rouge.

Paralyzed by Guillain–Barré syndrome

In April 2002 Toni falls ill with Guillain–Barré syndrome which destroys the myelin of the peripheral nerve system, paralyzing the muscles.

Confined to a hospital bed and then admitted to the National Medical Rehabilitation Centre of the Princess Sirindhorn in Thailand, regardless, Toni never stops working. In the beginning with a pencil between his lips and the use of his two thumbs, he creates a computer program for transforming the measurements sent by his colleagues from Mexico and Cambodia into clear and complete instructions, so that they can continue building bridges via remote control.

This way, Walter completes 29 bridges in Mexico and then returns to Ecuador, where from 2003 on he continues to build bridges in his homeland only

Bridges in Vietnam, Laos, Myanmar, Indonesia

After two years of rehabilitation Toni manages to walk again, and goes to Vietnam.

In the province of Ben Tre, with the help of Mai Son, retired Deputy Chairman of the Province and former Vietcong combatant, he creates a third team. From 2004 to 2008 he builds 58 bridges in the Vietnam Mekong Delta provinces of Ben Tre, Bac Lieu, Tra Vinh and Dong Thap.

Toni continues into neighbouring Laos, where he had previously built three bridges with his Cambodian team in 2006. With Laotian truck driver Lanh and three welders he builds 42 bridges between 2008 and 2010.

Mid-2008 he goes to Myanmar, which at the time was still under embargo by the United States of America and the European Union. In Yangon he presents a letter and pictures of bridges built to a member of the government, and just four days later receives authorization from the capital, Nay Pyi Taw, allowing him to build bridges also in Myanmar.

From that moment on, together with his Myanmar companion Aiklian, former artisanal gemstone digger, he builds bridges throughout the entire national territory, while five welders prepare the bridge components in a government shipyard in Yangon.

In late 2010 Toni el Suizo begins work in Indonesia. Tenaris donates the pipes from its Indonesian subsidiary, while the national government concedes the permits and offers a welding workshop outside of Jakarta. The Indonesian Navy and Army contribute most maritime transportation across this far-flung republic. Land transportation, however, is normally paid for by the community where the bridge is built.

The Indonesian team consists of Suntana, former construction factory operator in Dubai, and four welders. From 2011 to March 2014, the team built 30 bridges on Java and 6 on Sulawesi.

March 31 2018, Toni Rüttimann gets married in Myanmar.

Supply chain

Since 2005 Tenaris, the world’s largest producer of seamless steel pipe, has donated the pipes for the bridges Toni builds across the world – scrap and surplus pipes, sometimes even new – from their mills in Italy, Argentina, Brazil, Mexico, Colombia and Indonesia, including the long distance ocean freight to final destination.

For an improved bridge deck made of steel, starting in 2004, checkered steel plates were contributed: in Vietnam and in Ecuador by the provincial governments, in Laos and Myanmar by the Argentinean mill of  Ternium, one of Latin America’s principal steel producers.

Also in 2005, Toni begins using wire rope from the mountain cable cars of his home country. In Switzerland, the cable cars are required to change these cables frequently, due to the tight safety regulations imposed by the government.

This way Toni receives cables of several kilometres in length, large diameter and good quality.

Not all bridges built by Toni are still in service. In several places, especially in Ecuador and Cambodia, they have been replaced by vehicular bridges built by the government. In other places they have been rendered ugly due to the lack of maintenance, or even destroyed by natural disasters, as occurred in 2008 in the Páez River valley in Colombia.

Toni always works with local colleagues, so that interested communities can ask for their help for replacement of wire rope or other important repairs.

At present there have been no accidents of any significance during the construction of these bridges.  This is mainly attributable to the fact that local people are used to heavy labour and that strict safety rules and procedures have been followed during prefabrication and construction.

Three special bridges

Toni el Suizo has no favourite bridge, but in an interview with the Swiss magazine 'Schweizer Familie' he remembers three of them: one is the longest bridge he has built, with a span of 264 meters over the Aguarico river in Ecuador.

Then there is the international bridge between Honduras and El Salvador, that connects the communities of  Mapulaca and Victoria, built by villagers who, in previous years, had fought against each other.

Finally, a bridge built twice in Myanmar after being destroyed by KIA rebels (Kachin Independence Army) during guerrilla action. A monk, assisted by the most courageous men of the village, managed to rescue the bridge from the waters.

Quotes

"Some people need an entire earthquake to wake them up. I am one of these."

“My life is devoted to building bridges between the people on the planet. My dream is not so much to build bridges as such, but rather to help heal wounds, ease suffering, draw people together from all walks of life to create something that is beautiful, something that is good.”

“The strength of these bridges comes from the hearts of the people who built them with their own bare hands as well as from the invisible network of people from all over the world who have given the tangible support needed to make this endeavour possible. This strength comes from the people involved. It is the strength of hope that comes when you decide to take your future into your own hands, to change life and shape the world around you.”

Statistics

Awards 
 1997 23rd recipient of Adele Duttweiler Award
 1999 recipient of Dr. J.E. Brandenberger Award
 2000 Special Award of International Association for Bridge and Structural Engineering (IABSE) to recognize his original contributions to bridgebuilding in favour of the poor.

From 2001 onwards, Toni declines nominations for awards and prizes.

"I see myself on the level of the people I work with. [...] I prefer not to receive any awards and not to attend any gala dinners.”

References

External links 
 Slideshow with pictures of the international bridge between Honduras and El Salvador, Dan Van der Zwalm

1967 births
Living people
People from Maloja District
Swiss engineers
Bridge engineers
20th-century Swiss engineers
21st-century Swiss engineers
People with Guillain–Barré syndrome
Alumni of Lyceum Alpinum Zuoz